Papyrus 91 (in the Gregory-Aland numbering), designed by 𝔓91, is an early copy of the New Testament in Greek. It is a papyrus manuscript of the Acts of Apostles. The surviving texts of Acts are verses 2:30-37; 2:46-3:2. The manuscript paleographically has been assigned to the middle of the 3rd century.

Text 
The Greek text of this manuscript is a representative of the Alexandrian text-type, Comfort ascribed it as proto-Alexandrian, though the extant portion is too fragmentary for certainty. It has not been placed yet in Aland's Categories of New Testament manuscripts.

Location 
The larger portion of 𝔓91 is housed at the Instituto di Papyrologia (P. Mil. Vofl. Inv. 1224) at the Universita Degli Studi di Milano. The smaller portion is housed at the Ancient History Documentary Research Centre at Macquarie University (Inv. 360) in Sydney.

Textual Variants 

 2:31: omits  (of the Christ/Messiah ( being a Nomina Sacra)).
 2:32: According to the reconstruction of Philip Comfort and David Barrett, omits  (are).

 2:36:  (and) is omitted from after  (because/that).
 2:36: Swaps  (Master him and Christ/Messiah (Nomina Sacra)) to  ] (Christ/Messiah him and Master (Nomina Sacra))

See also 

 List of New Testament papyri

References

Further reading 

 Claudio Galazzi, P. Mil. Vogl. Inv. 1224 NT, Act. 2,30-37 e 2,46-3,2, Bulletin of the American Society of Papyrologists 19 (New Haven: 1982), pp. 39–45. 
 S. R. Pickering, ‘P. Macquarie Inv. 360 (+ P.Mil.Vogl. Inv. 1224): Acta Apostolorum 2.30-37, 2.46-3.2’ Zeitschrift für Papyrologie und Epigraphik 65 (Bonn: 1986), pp. 76–79.

New Testament papyri
3rd-century biblical manuscripts
Early Greek manuscripts of the New Testament
Acts of the Apostles papyri